Eggert Bogason (born 19 July 1960) is an Icelandic athlete. He competed in the men's discus throw at the 1988 Summer Olympics.

References

1960 births
Living people
Athletes (track and field) at the 1988 Summer Olympics
Eggert Bogason
Eggert Bogason
Place of birth missing (living people)